Annai Bhoomi is a 1985 Indian Tamil-language action film directed by R. Thyagarajan, starring Vijayakanth, Radha Ravi and Nalini. It is the first 3D film in Tamil cinema. The film was remade in Kannada as Namma Bhoomi.

Plot 

Two friends Raja and Somu are hired to kill a General Prabhakar. They kidnap him but have a change of heart when they learn that he actually tried to help them.

Cast 
Vijayakanth as Raja
Radha Ravi as Somu
Nalini as Nalini
Goundamani as Ragappa
Tiger Prabhakar as General Prabhakar
Srikanth as Vijayakumar
Thyagu as Shankar
Baby Sonia as Uma
Ilavarasi as Radha

Soundtrack 
The soundtrack was composed by Ilaiyaraaja, with lyrics by Vaali.

Reception 
Jayamanmadhan of Kalki wrote despite being a cardboard castle it looks decorative.

References

External links 
 

1980s Tamil-language films
1985 3D films
1985 films
Films directed by R. Thyagarajan (director)
Films scored by Ilaiyaraaja
Indian 3D films
Tamil films remade in other languages